The 2005 Magog municipal election was held on November 6, 2005, to elect a mayor and councillors in the city of Magog, Quebec. Marc Poulin was re-elected to a third term as mayor without opposition.

Results

Michel Voyer is a businessperson in Magog. In the 1980s, he was president of the downtown association and the Chamber of Commerce. He is a Canadian federalist and supported the "Oui" side in the 1992 Canadian referendum on the Charlottetown Accord. He served on the Magog Township council from 1995 until its merger with Magog in 2002, when he was elected for the new city's fifth ward. He initially favoured the de-merger of Magog Township in 2004, but changed his mind following two provincial amendments to the new city of Magog's charter. He was defeated in 2005 and later served on the board of Magog's business development corporation.

Sources: Patrick Lavery, "Magog mayor gets four more years: Four acclaimed to council, 16 vie for remaining seats," Sherbrooke Record, 18 October 2005, p. 3; "Meet your new municipal councils," Sherbrooke Record, 8 November 2005, p. 7.

References

2005 Quebec municipal elections
Magog, Quebec